DXBB may refer to:

 DXBB-AM, an AM radio station broadcasting in General Santos
 DXBB-FM, an FM radio station broadcasting in Butuan, branded as Wild FM